The Metro Mayor of the Liverpool City Region is a combined authority mayor or 'metro mayor',  who chairs the Liverpool City Region Combined Authority. The first, and current, officeholder is Steve Rotheram, who was  elected to the post in May 2017.

The office was created under the Cities and Local Government Devolution Act 2016 which allowed for the creation of 'Metro mayors' to lead combined authorities in England.

Powers and responsibilities
The Metro Mayor handles a £30 million a year budget, ear-marked for 30 years from 2017 as well as being in control of a consolidated transport budget, coordinating economic development in the region, the adult skills budget and strategic planning for land and other roles.

Currently, unlike the Mayors of Greater Manchester, London and West Yorkshire the metro mayor of the Liverpool City Region doesn't incorporate the powers of the Police and crime commissioner role for the relevant police constabulary (the Merseyside Police). In March 2019 Steve Rotheram requested to the government that the role be incorporated into the role of the Mayor of the Liverpool City Region, in line with the powers of these mayors. This was supported by the leader of Knowsley Borough Council. However, the Liverpool City Region is not the same area as the Merseyside Police area, which does not include Halton.

References

Liverpool City Region
Local government in Merseyside
Directly elected mayors in England and Wales